Ruben Garlini (born 27 May 1971) is a former Italian footballer.

He joined Serie C1 side U.C. AlbinoLeffe in July 2000.

He made his Serie B debut in a 2–1 defeat to the club where he began his career, Atalanta, on 14 September 2003.

He extended his contract with AlbinoLeffe for a number of time.

Honours

Como
Coppa Italia Serie C: 1996–97

Alzano Virescit
Coppa Italia Serie C: 1997–98

AlbinoLeffe
Coppa Italia Serie C: 2001–02

References

External links
 U.C. AlbinoLeffe Official Player Profile

Footballers from Bergamo
U.C. AlbinoLeffe players
Association football defenders
1971 births
Living people
Virtus Bergamo Alzano Seriate 1909 players
Italian footballers